The Sweet Sins of Sexy Susan (Austrian release: Susanne, die Wirtin von der Lahn, West German release: Die Wirtin von der Lahn) is a 1967 Austrian costume drama-sex comedy film directed by Franz Antel.

Background
Kurt Nachmann and Franz Antel created the lead character Susanne Delberg, a courtesan-actress, later madame and eventual social climber during and after the Napoleonic Wars, with inspiration from Wirtinnenvers, a well-known profane commercium song about the exploits of an innkeeper woman from the Lahn.

Plot
In the Kingdom of Westphalia, a drunken innkeeper woman (Ljuba Welitsch), just before her death, bequeaths her inn to Susanne Delberg (Teri Tordai as Terry Torday), barring the sole beneficiary Goppelmann (Oskar Sima) from the inheritance. Goppelmann recruits the local Studentenverbindung to discredit Susanne's establishment. The tide turns when Susanne manages to seduce the student leader Anselmo (Mike Marshall) but through him, she finds herself in a conspiracy against the governor Dulce (Jacques Herlin) and the marching Grande Armée also involving her friend Ferdinand (Harald Leipnitz).

Cast
Teri Tordai: Susanne Delberg
Harald Leipnitz: Ferdinand
Pascale Petit: Caroline
Mike Marshall: Anselmo
Jacques Herlin: Governor Dulce
Gunther Philipp: Wendich
Oskar Sima: Goppelmann
Hannelore Auer: Sophie
Franz Muxeneder: Pumpernickel
Judith Dornys: Dorine
Rosemarie Lindt: Bertha
Ljuba Welitsch: the innkeeper woman

Frau Wirtin series
Although the heroine ostensibly dies at the end of the film, the commercial success of The Sweet Sins of Sexy Susan triggered the Frau Wirtin (or Sexy Susan) series of five films on later adventures of Susanne Delberg, all of them featuring Teri Tordai in the title role.

The first two films (Sexy Susan Sins Again (Frau Wirtin hat auch einen Grafen, 1968) and House of Pleasure (Frau Wirtin hat auch eine Nichte, 1969)) narrate Susanne's adventures involving Napoleon Bonaparte. The following two films (Sexy Susan Knows How...! (Frau Wirtin bläst auch gern Trompete, 1970) and The Hostess Exceeds All Bounds (Frau Wirtin treibt es jetzt noch toller, 1970)) are about Susanne's exploits in Hungary where she settles after Napoleon is deposed in 1814. The last film (The Countess Died of Laughter (Frau Wirtins tolle Töchterlein, 1973)), produced three years after the previous one was conceived as a closing chapter of Susanne's life and diverts from the earlier films of the series in several aspects, also incorporating a great deal of archive footage from earlier films.

Kurt Nachmann, the screenwriter for the series wrote and directed a film with a similar theme in 1970: Josefine Mutzenbacher based on the novel Josephine Mutzenbacher – The Life Story of a Viennese Whore, as Told by Herself.

References

External links

Susanne, die Wirtin von der Lahn at Variety Distribution

1967 films
1960s sex comedy films
1960s historical comedy films
Austrian sex comedy films
Austrian historical comedy films
1960s German-language films
Films directed by Franz Antel
Films scored by Gianni Ferrio
Films about prostitution in Germany
Films set in the 1800s
Films set in Germany
1967 comedy films